Mitradev Mahanta (1894–1983) was a noted writer, dramatist, historical researcher, freedom fighter and actor from Assam. He won the Sangeet Natak Akademi Award. He was the president of the Assam Sahitya Sabha in 1964 held at Digobi. He was born into Assamese Kalita caste at Letugram Xatra, Sarbaibandha at Jorhat, Assam on 13 June 1894.

Literary works
Published Assamese Books'''
 Laklou Lani (লেকলৌ লানি) - 1915
 Biya Biporjoy (বিয়া বিপৰ্যয়) - 1924
 Gyan Lohori (জ্ঞান লহৰী) - 1924
 Chandrahar (চন্দ্ৰহাৰ) - 1925
 Dhurba (ধ্ৰুৱ) - 1925
 Mou Mohabharat - 1925
 Mohan Bhog (মোহন ভোগ) - 1925 etc.
 Niboka Roja (নিবোকা ৰজা) - 1928

References

Asom Sahitya Sabha Presidents
1894 births
Poets from Assam
People from Jorhat district
Assamese-language poets
1983 deaths
Recipients of the Sangeet Natak Akademi Award
20th-century Indian poets
Dramatists and playwrights from Assam